Saliunca is a genus of moths belonging to the family Zygaenidae.

The species of this genus are found in Africa.

Species
 Saliunca aenescens Hampson, 1919
 Saliunca aitcha  Ambille, 1892
 Saliunca analoga  Alberti, 1957
 Saliunca anhyalina  Alberti, 1957
 Saliunca aurifrons  Walker, 1864
 Saliunca chalconota  Hampson, 1919
 Saliunca cyanea  Hampson, 1919
 Saliunca cyanothorax  Hamspon, 1919
 Saliunca ealaensis  Alberti, 1957
 Saliunca egeria  Bethune-Baker, 1913
 Saliunca flavifrons  Plötz, 1880
 Saliunca flavifrontis Bryk, 1936
 Saliunca fulviceps  Hampson, 1919
 Saliunca ignicincta  Joannis, 1912
 Saliunca kamilila  Bethune-Baker, 1911
 Saliunca latipennis  Strand, 1912
 Saliunca meruana  Aurivillius, 1910
 Saliunca metacyanea  Hampson, 1919
 Saliunca mimetica  Jordan, 1907
 Saliunca nkolentangensis  Strand, 1912
 Saliunca orphnina  Hering, 1931
 Saliunca pallida  Alberti, 1957
 Saliunca rubriventris  Holland, 1920
 Saliunca rufidorsis  Plötz, 1880
 Saliunca sapphirina  Hampson, 1919
 Saliunca solora  Plötz, 1880
 Saliunca styx  Fabricius, 1775
 Saliunca tessmanni  Alberti, 1957
 Saliunca thoracica  Walker, 1856
 Saliunca triguttata  Aurivillius, 1925
 Saliunca ugandana  Jordan, 1908
 Saliunca ventralis  Jordan, 1907
 Saliunca vidua  Rebel, 1914

References

Zygaenidae
Zygaenidae genera